Summerland is a 2020 British drama film written and directed by Jessica Swale, starring Gemma Arterton, Gugu Mbatha-Raw, Lucas Bond, Dixie Egerickx, Siân Phillips, Penelope Wilton and Tom Courtenay.

Arterton plays as a reclusive writer who is forced to take in a young boy entrusted to her care during the Battle of Britain in 1940, and later, during the early days of the London Blitz. It was released in the United Kingdom on 31 July 2020 by Lionsgate.

Plot
In 1940 Alice Lamb, who is working on her typewriter, lives in a cottage by the seaside in Kent. She has lived in the village since before the start of WWII, during which time she tolerated the harassment by local children who thought she was a witch because she was a loner.

As part of the war effort, the brusque and reclusive writer is entrusted with the care of a young boy, Frank, who has been evacuated from London where it is unsafe. Alice had not volunteered to be a host and does not want to care for him as she fears it will interfere with her work researching mythology and folklore, but reluctantly agrees to let him stay believing that he has nowhere else to go and she will be able to be rid of him in a week.
 
As she begins to accept Frank's presence, she recalls her relationship with Vera, a fellow student at university who wanted to be a novelist and with whom she fell in love. Vera breaks Alice's heart when she decides to end their relationship not because it was considered taboo, but because she has a strong desire to be a mother and it would not be possible with Alice.

Alice and Frank start to bond after he takes an interest in her scholarly work and she explains Fata Morgana mirages to him. She tells him about The Summerland, the pagan idea of the afterlife that existed all around them. However, at the end of their week together she is still willing to let him be transferred to another home. Alice changes her mind and decides to keep Frank with her after learning that moving him to a new family will require his moving to another village and school.

The day before Frank's birthday Alice is informed that his father has been killed in battle and she must break the news to him. As she was devastated by the similar loss of her own father, Alice decides to delay telling Frank. While preparing a permanent room for him to stay in, she finds photographs of Frank and his parents in his scrapbook and is shocked to discover that his mother is Vera. At the same time, during an argument with a school friend, Frank finds out that his father had died. Hurt and angry because Alice had not told him, Frank runs away to be with his mother in London. Alice goes after him, and the two arrive in time to find his home destroyed and in flames after a bombing. Alice and Frank spend the night in an air raid shelter and head back to Kent the following morning.

While driving back to Kent, Frank yells at Alice to stop, jumps out and runs to the sea. Alice follows him onto the rocks, pleading with him that it isn't safe and to come back. Frank shouts at her that she knew about his father’s death and didn’t tell him. Distraught, Alice tells him that she wanted to but didn’t know how to and apologises. Frank says that he saw his father in Summerland. When he turns round, he slips and falls backwards into the water. He flails under the water until Alice swims out to where he is and manages to rescue him. After helping him get out, both of them gasp and cough up water profusely.

The next morning, Alice brings Frank breakfast which he initially refuses. Alice reveals how she lost her own father years earlier, that she struggled to come to terms with it. She then shows him the room she prepared for him, comforting him when he becomes upset looking through some family photos.

When they return home a few days later, they find Vera waiting for them. She had not been home at the time of the bomb attacks. Vera confesses to having engineered the selection of Alice as the host for Frank because she knew that if anything were to happen to her, Alice would take care of him.

Back in the present time, Alice is finalizing her manuscript and is interrupted by Vera. The two reunited and had since been living together. Alice and Vera are walking on the beach and are joined by an adult Frank who has come to visit his two mothers. Frank reads the dedication in Alice's manuscript, and it is dedicated to him.

Cast
Gemma Arterton as Alice Lamb
Penelope Wilton as Older Alice
Gugu Mbatha-Raw as Vera
Martina Laird as Older Vera
Tom Courtenay as Mr Sullivan
Lucas Bond as Frank
Dixie Egerickx as Edie
Siân Phillips as Margaret Corey
Amanda Root as Mrs Lawrence
Jessica Gunning as Mrs Bassett
Dominic McGreevy as Boy
Aoibhine McFlynn as Cassie
Joshua Riley as Freddie

Production
It was announced in April 2017 that Gemma Arterton had been cast in playwright Jessica Swale's directorial debut, with Swale also writing the screenplay. In May 2018, Gugu Mbatha-Raw, Penelope Wilton and Tom Courtenay were added to the cast.

Production was underway by September 2018, with filming locations throughout East Sussex in the towns of Seaford & Brighton as well as in the county of Kent. During October 2018, locations in Kent included the Chatham Historic Dockyard and Anchor Wharf, with shots of Dover Castle in Dover. The Sail and Colour Loft exterior, Church Lane, and Ropery exterior of the Dockyard doubled as East London streets during the Blitz; the Captain's House on Officer's Terrace was featured as a bombed-out house; and the cellars of the Fitted Rigging House on the Wharf doubled as an air raid shelter. Production wrapped in the last week of October.

Release
Embankment Films sold the United Kingdom distribution rights to Lionsgate UK on 31 October 2018. IFC Films acquired United States rights on 20 April 2020.

Summerland was released in the UK, and in selected theatres in the U.S., on 31 July 2020.

Critical reception
The website's critical consensus states: "In Summerland, the living is a little too easy to raise dramatic stakes -- but Gemma Arterton's performance adds some much-needed extra heat." On Metacritic, the film has a weighted score of 56 out of 100, based on 22 critics, indicating "mixed or average reviews".

Home media
Summerland was released on DVD in Region 2 by Lionsgate Home Entertainment on 12 October 2020. It was released on Blu-ray and DVD in Region A/1 by IFC Films on 17 November 2020.

References

External links
 
 
  Summerland at Quickfire Films
 
 
  Summerland at British Council Films Directory

2020 films
2020 directorial debut films
2020 drama films
2020 LGBT-related films
British drama films
British LGBT-related films
Lesbian-related films
British World War II films
Films shot in East Sussex
IFC Films films
Lionsgate films
2020s English-language films
2020s British films